The Spirit Ring is a 1992 historical fantasy by Lois McMaster Bujold, based on Agricola's De re metallica, combined with the folkloric tradition of the grateful dead and the life of Benvenuto Cellini.

Plot

In the fictional Italian city-state of Montefoglia, Fiametta is the 15-year-old daughter of a master metal-worker and magician: Prospero Beneforte. He indulges her wish to learn to make magical items of metal, though this is not generally viewed as appropriate for her gender, and she is casting a lion's-head ring with a love spell at the story's opening. The spell in fact identifies a 'true heart', rather than capturing such a heart, and Fiametta is chagrined when the heart it selects belongs to a young Swiss miner. This modest hero, Thur Ochs, has come to Montefoglia because his brother Uri, has secured him a position as an apprentice to Prospero Beneforte.

But Uri is killed in the fight when Duke Sandrino is usurped by an ambitious mercenary leader, Lord Ferrante. Ferrante's magician, Vitelli, pickles Uri's body in salt for future use in making a ring of power — the spirit ring of the book's title. Fiametta and her father, who were present to deliver a commissioned work when the fight began, manage to escape but are followed by Ferrante's men. Prospero dies of a heart attack while holding the attackers back to let Fiametta escape, and his body eventually is added to that of Uri as a resource for ring-making.

The story then follows Fiametta, Thur, and the local Abbot as they find out Lord Ferrante's plans and invent ways to block them. The grandest of these is the use of the casting of a larger-than-life bronze Perseus figure, Master Beneforte's masterwork that had only reached the wax model stage before his death, and the voluntary investment in it of the spirit of Uri Ochs. This invincible soldier is able to lead a rabble of townspeople into the castle and kills Lord Ferrante just before it cools to immobility. The Abbot manages to shrive the spirits of the assorted casualties of the concluding battle, Fiametta manages to unmake the ring, and Master Beneforte in spirit form helps end the career of Vitelli.

Reception
Publishers Weekly praised it as "enthralling" and "crisply paced [and] fully developed", while the SF Site called it "Bujold at her storytelling best" and "a fine and stirring yarn".

Infinity Plus stated that it has "[g]ood writing, decent plot, engaging characters, [and] logical, well put-together world", but found it to be "somehow lacking a certain snap that Bujold has consistently brought to her Science Fiction". At Tor.com, Jo Walton noted that she "ought to like [the book] more", emphasizing that it has "wonderful ingredients", that she has "intellectual admiration" for it, and that it would be easy to discuss the book "in a way that really made it sound amazing by dwelling on the things that are amazing", but ultimately concluding that "there's no spark" and that Bujold has "written books that were so much better".

References

1992 American novels
American fantasy novels
Novels by Lois McMaster Bujold
Novels set in Italy